Dan's Mountain Wildlife Management Area is a Wildlife Management Area in Allegany County, Maryland. Bobcats and black bears are found in the area. Hunting activities are primarily oriented around white-tailed deer and turkeys.

References

External links
 Dan's Mountain Wildlife Management Area

Wildlife management areas of Maryland
Protected areas of Allegany County, Maryland

IUCN Category V